Lautisporopsis is a fungal genus  in the family Halosphaeriaceae. This is a monotypic genus, containing the single species Lautisporopsis circumvestita.

References

Microascales
Monotypic Sordariomycetes genera